Clavibacter nebraskensis is a species of bacteria in the genus Clavibacter. It causes wilt and blight in maize,
 called Goss's wilt.

Genetics 
An annotated nucleotide sequence was expected to be available soon after 2011. The single chromosome is of 3.06 megabases (of which the GC-content is 73.0), mostly collinear, and contains 2 rRNA operons, and 45 tRNAs.  when a partial annotation was available, it appeared to contain 50 pseudogenes and no insertion elements. A chloride channel is suspected to be a virulence factor.

References

Microbacteriaceae
Bacteria described in 1974